Tricia Lovegrove is a Canadian cross-country skier. She represented Canada at the 1988 Winter Paralympics, at the 1992 Winter Paralympics and at the 1994 Winter Paralympics.

She won the bronze medal together with Kim Umback and Sandra Lecour in the women's 3x5 km relay B1-3 event.

References 

Living people
Year of birth missing (living people)
Place of birth missing (living people)
Canadian female cross-country skiers
Cross-country skiers at the 1988 Winter Paralympics
Cross-country skiers at the 1992 Winter Paralympics
Cross-country skiers at the 1994 Winter Paralympics
Medalists at the 1988 Winter Paralympics
Paralympic bronze medalists for Canada
Paralympic cross-country skiers of Canada
Paralympic medalists in cross-country skiing